Parliamentary elections were held in Slovakia on 28 November 1954, alongside national elections. All 103 seats in the National Council were won by the National Front.

Results

References

1954 elections in Czechoslovakia
Parliamentary elections in Slovakia
Legislative elections in Czechoslovakia
Czechoslovakia
One-party elections
November 1954 events in Europe
Election and referendum articles with incomplete results